Morennaya Hill is a hill rising to , standing  southwest of Mabus Point on the coast of Antarctica. It was discovered by the Australasian Antarctic Expedition under Douglas Mawson, 1911–14, and was mapped by the Soviet expedition of 1956, who named it Morennaya (morainic).

References

Australasian Antarctic Expedition
Hills of Queen Mary Land